Castle Walk is a dance originated and made famous by Vernon and Irene Castle. The Castle Walk  became  popular through its introduction into the Tango. "Castle Walk" is also a popular American song (1914) composed for Vernon and Irene Castle by James Reese Europe (1880–1919) and Ford Thompson Dabney (1883–1958). It was first recorded in 1914.

The dance 
In this dance, the man continually goes forward and the lady backward. In order that the lady may be properly guided about the room, the man's arm encircles her just under her arm, while her left hand rests on the man's right arm. The position of the lady's right arm and the man's left arm is high, with their hands clasped, see the illustration.

The man starts forward with his left foot and the lady backward with her right, simply walking with gliding steps keeping on the toes, one count of the music to each step. This step is continued to the end of the room, where a large circle is begun, which is gradually made smaller and smaller, until it is ended by whirling completely around three times, to three counts of the music and then dip.

The Castle Walk may be varied by describing the figure eight or zig-zag instead of the large circle.

To make the three whirls is rather a difficult matter, as it must be done very rapidly to accomplish
a complete revolution to one beat of the music, but with a little practice it is soon learned.

Troy Kinney describes the Castle Walk as part of One-Step as follows: 

This is a walking step of direct advance and retreat, not used to move to the side. The couple are in closed position, the woman, therefore, stepping backward as the man steps forward, and vice versa. The advancing foot is planted in fourth position, the knee straight, the toe down so that the ball of the foot strikes the floor first. The walk presents an appearance of strutting, although the shoulders are held level, and the body firm; a sharp twist that punctuates each step is effected by means of pivoting on the supporting foot. The shoulder and hip movements that originally characterised the "trot" are no longer practiced.

The song 
 "The Castle Walk," trot and one-step, Jos. W. Stern & Co., publisher (Joseph W. Stern; 1870–1934) (©1914);

Early discography 
 "Castle Walk," Europe's Society Orchestra, Victor, Matrix: B-14434, recorded February 10, 1914, New York
 Musicians:

 Emporia-born Crickett Smith (1881–1947), cornet
 Detroit-born Edgar Campbell (né Edgar O. Campbell; born 1889), clarinet
<li> Tracy Cooper, violin
<li> George Smith, violin
<li> Walter Scott, violin
 Leonard Smith, piano
 Washington, D.C.-born Ford Thompson Dabney (1883–1958)
 Buddy Gilmore, drums
 Jim Europe, leader, arranger
<li> Five unidentified banjoists and mandolinists

 "Castle Walk," Prince's Band, Columbia, Matrix: 36930, catalog no. A5562, recorded April 15, 1914, New York

References

External links 

Dance History Archives

Ballroom dance